Vladimir Viktorovich Zelenovskiy (born 20 June 1983) is a Russian professional football coach and a former player. He is a conditioning coach for PFC Krylia Sovetov Samara.

Club career
He made his debut in the Russian Premier League in 2000 for FC Rotor Volgograd.

References

1983 births
People from Naberezhnye Chelny
Living people
Russian footballers
Russia under-21 international footballers
Association football midfielders
FC Rotor Volgograd players
FC Lada-Tolyatti players
Russian Premier League players
FC Tyumen players
FC Mordovia Saransk players
Russian football managers
Russian expatriate football managers
Expatriate football managers in Kazakhstan
FC Aktobe managers
FC Tekstilshchik Ivanovo players
FC Nosta Novotroitsk players
Sportspeople from Tatarstan